The 1934 European Amateur Boxing Championships were held in Budapest, Hungary from 11 to 15 April. It was the fourth edition of the competition, organised by the European governing body for amateur boxing, EABA. There were 74 fighters from 13 countries participating.

Medal winners

Medal table

References

External links
European Championships
Results
EABA Boxing

European Amateur Boxing Championships
Boxing
European Amateur Boxing Championships
International boxing competitions hosted by Hungary
1930s in Budapest
European Amateur Boxing Championships
International sports competitions in Budapest